Calophyllum walkeri is a species of flowering plant in the Calophyllaceae family. It is found only in Sri Lanka. It is reddish brown with dark streaks and is a strong, durable wood. It is used for beams, rafters, posts & door frames. It weighs about 46 lbs per cubic foot. It can be found in hill country in Sri Lanka. The leaves and bark have fragments. It is known as කින (Kina) in Sinhala.

References

Endemic flora of Sri Lanka
Vulnerable plants
walkeri
Taxonomy articles created by Polbot